Lucille Maurer (née Darvin; 1922 – June 17, 1996) was the first woman Treasurer of Maryland.

Life
Maurer graduated from the University of North Carolina at Chapel Hill with a Bachelor of Arts in Economics, and she worked as an economist at the U.S. Tariff Commission. She obtained a Master of Arts in General Studies from Yale University and moved to Montgomery County, Maryland in 1950.

In 1969, Maurer was appointed to fill a vacancy in the Maryland House of Delegates after serving two terms on the county school board. She was re-elected to several terms, serving as a member of the Ways and Means Committee for sixteen years and chairing the Education Committee and the Tax and Trade Committee. She was known for her work on educational issues, devising a formula to equalize public education funding by increasing state funds for poorer jurisdictions.

Maurer ran for the State Senate in 1986 and lost. In 1987, she was elected by the General Assembly to serve as the state treasurer, winning over Governor Schaefer's favored candidate. She was the 21st elected treasurer of Maryland, and the first woman to serve in that role.

As treasurer for nine years, Maurer implemented modern bookkeeping processes and was praised for her management of the state's stock portfolio.

After being hospitalized with a brain tumor, Maurer resigned from her position in January 1996. She died at her home in Silver Spring, Maryland on June 17, 1996.

References

External links 

 Lucille Maurer papers at the University of Maryland libraries

1922 births
1996 deaths
20th-century American politicians
20th-century American women politicians
Democratic Party members of the Maryland House of Delegates
People from Silver Spring, Maryland
People from Spring Valley, New York
State treasurers of Maryland
University of North Carolina at Chapel Hill alumni
Yale University alumni
Women state legislators in Maryland